Charles Ross (12 August 1878 – 20 October 1969) was an Australian rules footballer who played with Carlton in the Victorian Football League (VFL).

Family
The son of George Ross (1844-1920) and Eleanor Ross (1844-1928), née Kearney, Charles Ross was born at Beechworth, Victoria, on 12 August 1878.

He married Eleanor Jane Carss (1886-1978) on 1 June 1911.

Football
He was cleared from Brunswick to Carlton on 1 June 1900.

He was injured in his last senior match with Carlton, against St Kilda, at the Junction Oval, on 28 May 1904.

References

Further reading

External links 

 
 Ross's playing statistics from the VFA Project
 Ross's profile at Blueseum

1878 births
1969 deaths
Australian rules footballers from Victoria (Australia)
Brunswick Football Club players
Carlton Football Club players